Dhee may refer to:
 Dhee (film)
 Dhee (singer)
 Dhee (TV series)